Candy Spence Ezzell (born November 26, 1953 in Artesia, New Mexico) is an American politician and a Republican member of the New Mexico House of Representatives representing District 58 since January 2005.

Education
Ezzell attended Eastern New Mexico University and New Mexico State University.

Elections
2012 Ezzell and returning 2006 Democratic challenger Pablo Martinez were both unopposed for their June 5, 2012 primaries, setting up a rematch; Ezzell won the November 6, 2012 General election with 3,888 votes (62%) against Martinez.
2004 To challenge District 58 incumbent Democratic Representative Pauline Ponce, Ezzell was unopposed for the June 1, 2004 Republican Primary, winning with 271 votes and won the three-way November 2, 2004 General election with 3,632 votes (54.6%) against Representative Ponce and Libertarian candidate George Peterson.
2006 Ezzell was unopposed for the June 6, 2006 Republican Primary, winning with 591 votes and won the November 7, 2006 General election with 2,619 votes (54.1%) against Democratic nominee Pablo Martinez.
2008 Ezzell and returning 2004 opponent George Peterson, running as a Democrat, were both unopposed for their June 8, 2008 primaries, setting up a rematch; Ezzell won the November 4, 2008 General election with 4,208 votes (61.6%) against Peterson.
2010 Ezzell was unopposed for the June 1, 2010 Republican Primary, winning with 925 votes and won the November 2, 2010 General election with 3,036 votes (64.9%) against Democratic nominee Michael Trujillo.

References

External links
Official page at the New Mexico Legislature

Candy Spence Ezzell at Ballotpedia
Candy Spence Ezzell at the National Institute on Money in State Politics

1953 births
Living people
Eastern New Mexico University alumni
Republican Party members of the New Mexico House of Representatives
People from Artesia, New Mexico
People from Roswell, New Mexico
New Mexico State University alumni
Women state legislators in New Mexico
21st-century American politicians
21st-century American women politicians